¿Quién es la máscara? is a Colombian reality singing competition television series that premiered on Canal RCN on 9 October 2021. It is based on the South Korean television show King of Mask Singer created by Seo Chang-man.

On January 23, 2022, Zorro (Actor and singer Juan Sebastián Quintero) was declared the winner of the first season, and Coco Loco (Actor and singer Karoll Márquez) the runner-up.

Format 
A group of celebrities hide behind a character while a panel will have to guess who is under the mask. The competitors face-off and perform a song of their choice. The studio audience votes for their favorite performance and the winner is safe for the week, while the performer with the fewest votes is nominated for elimination. The panelists then decide which of the nominated performer is eliminated, the eliminated performer must then reveal their identity.

Panelists and host 
The panelists consist of singer Llane, actress Lina Tejeiro, television personality Alejandra Azcárate, and comedian Juanda Caribe. The show is hosted by Piter Albeiro.

Contestants

Part 1

Part 2

Episodes

Week 1 (9 and 10 October)

Week 2 (16 and 17 October)

Week 3 (23 and 24 October)

Week 4 (30 and 31 October)

Week 5 (6 and 7 November)

Week 6 (13 and 14 November) 
 Group Performance: "La Gozadera" by Gente de Zona feat. Marc Anthony

Week 7 (20 and 21 November)

Week 8 (27 and 28 November)

Week 9 (4 and 5 December)

Week 10 (11 and 12 December)

Week 11 (18 and 19 December)

Week 12 (15 and 16 January) 

 Group Performance: "Sube a mi Moto" by Menudo

 Group Performance: "Te Voy a Hacer Falta" by Rikarena

 Group Performance: "Florecita Rockera" by Aterciopelados

Week 13 (22 and 23 January)

Ratings

References

External links 
 

2021 Colombian television series debuts
RCN Televisión original programming
Colombian reality television series
Spanish-language television shows
2020s Colombian television series
Television series by Endemol
Masked Singer